Bedford Carriage Sidings are  located in Bedford, Bedfordshire, England on the Midland Main Line, near Bedford station.

History 
The former steam engine shed was situated on the Down side of the main line. The depot code was BE.

From January to March 1964, Class 08 shunters and Class 27 locomotives could be seen.

Present 
The sidings on the Up side of the mainline provide stabling for Thameslink Class 377 and Class 700 EMUs.

Trains are serviced and repaired at the nearby Bedford Cauldwell Walk depot.

Driver depots for Thameslink and Freightliner drivers are located in nearby buildings.

References 
 

Railway sidings in England
Train driver depots in England